A Night Out is a play written by Harold Pinter in 1959.

Albert Stokes, a loner in his late twenties lives with his emotionally suffocating mother and works in an office. After being falsely accused of groping a female at an office party, he wanders the streets until he meets a girl, who invites him to her flat, where he responds to her overtures by angrily demeaning her. Then he returns home to his mother.

The play had its first performance on the BBC Third Programme on 1 March 1960, with Pinter's acting-school classmate and friend Barry Foster as Albert Stokes, Harold Pinter as Seeley, and Vivien Merchant, Pinter's first wife, as the Girl. (Full production details and "Radio Review" accessible at www.haroldpinter.org.) 

Its performance on television a month later, on 24 April 1960, was Pinter's first big success as a playwright in that medium. As presented on ABC Weekend TV's Armchair Theatre, it was viewed by 6.4 million households, at that time a record for a single television drama.

Some other ABC production details (full cast and credits accessible at BFI Screenonline):
Director Philip Saville 
Producer Sydney Newman 
Designer Assheton Gorton

Cast

Tom Bell – Albert Stokes
Madge Ryan – Mrs Stokes
Harold Pinter (as David Baron) – Seeley
Vivien Merchant – Girl
Arthur Lowe – Mr King
Stanley Meadows – Gidney

References

External links 
 Screenonline on ABC production of 'A Night Out'; see "Full Synopsis."
 A Night Out at haroldpinter.org 
 

1959 plays
1960 television plays
Plays by Harold Pinter
1960 radio dramas
Television shows produced by ABC Weekend TV